Matt Pickens (born April 5, 1982) is an American retired soccer player who is currently the goalkeeping coach for Nashville SC in  Major League Soccer.

Career

Youth and amateur
Pickens initially attended Meramec Community College before playing college soccer for Missouri State University from 2000 to 2003. He also played for Chicago Fire Premier in the USL Premier Development League.

Professional

Upon graduating, Pickens was drafted 19th overall in the 2004 MLS SuperDraft by the Fire. He was not able, however, to break through a deep lineup of Fire goalkeepers, which initially included Henry Ring and D.J. Countess, and later Zach Thornton. He was loaned out for much of the year to the A-League Virginia Beach Mariners, where he played 290 minutes, conceding only 3 goals.

During the latter half of 2006, after an injury to Zach Thornton, Pickens started in goal for the Fire even once Thornton was match fit again. Pickens won the 2006 Open Cup as the starter for Chicago Fire. Also in 2006, was his first MLS play-off start on October 22, 2006 for the Fire, keeping a clean sheet in a game that the Fire won, 1-0 thanks to a goal from Justin Mapp in the 35th minute.  Zach Thornton was traded to the Colorado Rapids before the 2007 season, clearing the way for Pickens to start.

In February 2008, Pickens signed a deal with Queens Park Rangers until the end of the 2008 season.

In May 2008, it was announced that Pickens would not have his contract extended and that he would be released by the club at the end of June.

Pickens trained/trailed with numerous clubs in England and Scotland after his release, including Hibernian, Doncaster Rovers, Falkirk and Nottingham Forest, the latter of which he claims he was close to signing with. However, despite not securing a new contract in Europe, Chicago Fire traded Pickens rights to Colorado Rapids on January 15, 2009 and was signed by the club shortly after.

Pickens helped the Rapids to playoff appearances in 2010 and 2011.  In 2010 the Rapids and Pickens won their first MLS Cup, beating FC Dallas 2-1 in extra time.  Early in the 2013 season, Pickens suffered a broken arm in a match against Real Salt Lake making this his last appearance with the Rapids.

Pickens was released early in the 2014 season.

After Pickens was released by Colorado Rapids in early 2014 New England Revolution acquired him in the waiver draft.

Soon after signing with New England, Pickens was sold to Tampa Bay Rowdies in the North American Soccer League.

On November 30, 2017 Nashville SC announced Pickens as the club's first signing ahead of their inaugural 2018 season in United Soccer League.

Nashville S.C. earned back to back playoff appearances in 2018 and 2019. Pickens was the USL Championship Goalkeeper of the year in 2019. Also in 2019, Pickens broke the 100 professional shutouts milestone in his career.

International
As of December 2010, Pickens has been called up to five United States training camps, including the camp in January 2011.  However, he has never earned a national cap or been part of the final 18-man roster.

Coaching
In January 2020, Pickens was announced as the first goalkeeping coach for Major League Soccer's Nashville SC.

Honors

Chicago Fire
U.S. Open Cup: 2006

Colorado Rapids
Major League Soccer Eastern Conference Championship: 2010
Major League Soccer MLS Cup: 2010

Nashville SC

2019 USL Championship Goalkeeper of the Year

References

External links
 Tampa Bay Rowdies profile
 

1982 births
Living people
American soccer players
Chicago Fire FC players
Chicago Fire U-23 players
Colorado Rapids players
Major League Soccer players
People from Washington, Missouri
A-League (1995–2004) players
USL League Two players
North American Soccer League players
Virginia Beach Mariners players
Queens Park Rangers F.C. players
Soccer players from Missouri
Chicago Fire FC draft picks
New England Revolution players
Tampa Bay Rowdies players
Nashville SC (2018–19) players
USL Championship players
Association football goalkeepers
Association football goalkeeping coaches
Missouri State Bears soccer players
Nashville SC non-playing staff